Igor Leandro Goularte do Nascimento (born 8 July 1996) is a Brazilian professional footballer who plays as a forward for Caxias-RS.

Career
In June 2021, ABC Color announced that Goularte became River Plate Asunción's 15th signing.

References

External links
 Soccerway Profile

1996 births
Living people
Brazilian footballers
Association football forwards
Campeonato Brasileiro Série A players
Campeonato Brasileiro Série C players
Luverdense Esporte Clube players
Avaí FC players
Ascenso MX players
Correcaminos UAT footballers
Brazilian expatriate footballers
Brazilian expatriate sportspeople in Mexico
Expatriate footballers in Mexico
Footballers from Rio de Janeiro (city)